This is a list of TV and radio stations, newspapers, magazines, websites and advertising agencies based at Dubai Media City.

TV stations 
 Fatafeat
 Citruss TV
 CNBC Arabia

Online News Magazines 
 Khaleej Mag
 Khaleej Times

References 

Mass media in Dubai